Rosalba Pippa (born 20 August 1982), better known by her stage name Arisa, is an Italian singer, actress, and television personality.

Early life 
Arisa was born in Genoa, Italy. A week after her birth, her family moved back to their original hometown, Pignola, a village a few kilometres from Potenza. Her stage name is an acronym of her family members' names: A from her father, Antonio; R from her own name, Rosalba; I and S from her sisters, Isabella and Sabrina; and A from her mother, Assunta.

In 1999, she won first prize in the Cantacavallo competition in Teggiano for her singing ability. The president of the jury, journalist and writer Bianca Fasano, personally delivered the cup.

Career
Arisa rose to fame after her participation in the Sanremo Music Festival 2009. She placed first in the newcomers' section and won the Mia Martini Critics Award with her entry, "Sincerità". In early 2009, she released her first album, also titled Sincerità. In January 2010 she released her second album, Malamorenò. In late 2011 she starred as judge in the fifth season of the Italian version of The X Factor, broadcast on Sky Uno.

In February 2012, Arisa returned to the Italian musical scene, performing her single "La notte" in the Sanremo Music Festival. The song placed second in the competition and it later topped the Italian Singles Chart. It was also included in her third studio album, Amami, which was released on 15 February 2012.

In February 2014, Arisa won the Sanremo Music Festival with the song "Controvento".

The album Una nuova Rosalba in città was released on 8 February 2019 and Ero romantica on 26 November 2021.

Discography

Studio albums

Live albums

Compilations

Singles

As lead artist

As featured artist

Awards

Filmography

References

External links
 Singer profile at Warner Music web site
 

People from the Province of Potenza
1982 births
Living people
Sanremo Music Festival winners of the newcomers section
Sanremo Music Festival winners
21st-century Italian singers
21st-century Italian women singers
Reality show winners